El ministerio del tiempo (English title: The Ministry of Time) is a Spanish fantasy television series created by Javier and Pablo Olivares and produced by Onza Partners and Cliffhanger for Televisión Española (TVE). It premiered on 24 February 2015 on TVE's main channel La 1. The series follows the exploits of an investigative team in the fictional Ministry of Time, which deals with incidents caused by time travel that can cause changes to the present day.

On 24 March 2015, it was confirmed that TVE had renewed the series for a second season. The show was renewed for a third season on 22 September 2016. On 29 December 2016 it was announced that RTVE had sold the rights to Netflix to broadcast the third series internationally, outside of Spain, resulting in a bigger production budget.

The series was renewed for a fourth season, which started airing on Televisión Española on 5 May 2020. It was known that HBO has acquired the broadcasting rights for the series, at least on HBO Spain and HBO Portugal.

Plot

The Ministry of Time is the best kept and most closely guarded secret of the Spanish government: an autonomous government institution that reports directly to the Prime Minister and the Spanish Monarch. Its patrols watch the doors of time so that no intruder from other eras can change history for their own benefit.

The series follows the assignments of the Ministry's newest patrol: the one formed by Army of Flanders soldier Alonso de Entrerríos, 19th century student Amelia Folch and 21st century SAMUR paramedic Julián Martínez.

Cast and characters

Main characters

 Julián Martínez (Rodolfo Sancho), one of three members of the new patrol. He is a trained SAMUR paramedic from 21st century Madrid, present as a member of the patrol through season 1 and the second half of season 2. His absence during the first half of season 2 was due to shooting for Mar de plástico, and he left the series at the end of that season after failing to reach an agreement with the show's producers. In November 2019, however, it was confirmed he will return for season 4.
 Amelia Folch (Aura Garrido), the leader of the patrol. She is a late 19th-century pioneering university student and an only child from an upper-class Barcelona family, still living with her parents. Garrido left the series halfway through the third season citing scheduling conflicts after she, like Sancho, signed on to other projects due to renewal uncertainty. She left on good terms and was open to returning in the future. In November 2019, her return in season 4 was confirmed.
 Alonso de Entrerríos (Nacho Fresneda), one of three members of the patrol. A highly experienced 16th-century soldier from Seville, he is portrayed as an expert in fields of combat. He was recruited just prior to being executed, and now lives in the 21st century.
 Irene Larra Girón (Cayetana Guillén Cuervo), Head of Logistics inside the Ministry. A lesbian from the repressed 1960s, her character is used to express a less rigid viewpoint within the Ministry.
 Ernesto Jiménez, Chief Operating Officer inside the Ministry. Recruited from the 15th century, he is fiercely incorruptible and a perfectionist.  In the fourth episode of Season 1 it is disclosed that he is the father of Tomas de Torquemada, the first Grand Inquisitor of the Spanish Inquisition.
 Undersecretary Salvador Martí (Jaime Blanch), Head of the Ministry. His (and the Ministry's) overriding priority is to protect and repair history.
 Angustias Vázquez (Francesca Piñón), personal secretary to Salvador and widow of a Ministry agent.
 Jesús Méndez Pontón (Hugo Silva), AKA "Pacino", a replacement member for Julián in the second and third seasons. He is a handsome police officer from 1981 Madrid, nicknamed "Pacino" due to his resemblance to actor Al Pacino, whom he admires.
 Lola Mendieta (Natalia Millán): A former agent of the Ministry who was believed to have died on a mission. She provided information about clandestine doors of time to a number of people. Her younger self (played by Macarena García) is recruited to the Ministry, eventually joining the patrol. She is the first and only agent to ever be recruited twice.

Recurring characters
 Diego Velázquez (Julián Villagrán): One of the most important painters in Spanish history, known for Las Meninas and The Surrender of Breda, who was recruited by the Ministry as a facial composite draftsman.
 Enric Folch (Xavier Boada) and Carme (Fanny Gautier): Amelia's parents. While he appears more tolerant about his daughter's concerns, she presses her to marry and settle down.
 Blanca: Alonso's wife, who believes him to be dead since she does not know his execution was avoided by the Ministry.
 Elena Castillo: Alonso's love interest in the present day and Bianca's doppelgänger.
 Susana Torres (Mar Saura): The Prime Minister's liaison with the Ministry. Her visits usually mean bad news for Salvador.
 Lucía (Luisa Gavasa): Appears in the 3rd season claiming to be Lola Mendieta's daughter.
 Ambrogio Spinola: One of the main generals of the Spanish Army during the 17th century, most notable for the siege of Breda. He works for the Ministry, and admits he made the mistake of reading about his fate in the books.
 Enriqueta Martí (María Rodríguez): A serial murderer who worked as Amelia's maid for a short time.
 Marisa (Nieve de Medina): An old love interest of Ernesto's who has returned to work in the Ministry.
 Armando Leiva (José Antonio Lobato): A former agent who rebelled against the Ministry when Salvador refused to allow him to bring his 10-year-old son, diagnosed with leukemia, to the present so that doctors from the 21st century could tend to him.
 Maite (Mar Ulldemolins): Julián's late wife, whom he visits by way of the doors of time.
 Paul Walcott (Jimmy Shaw): An American time traveller who worked for mysterious corporation Darrow Ltd.
 Bosco de Sobrecasa: A high-ranking member, possibly the leader, of the Society of the Exterminating Angel, which has discovered the existence of the Ministry and plans to use the time doors to fully restore absolute monarchy in Spain across history.
 Juan Martín Díez "El Empecinado" (Hovik Keuchkerian): A notable guerrilla combatant who becomes the target of two Napoleonic soldiers who travel to 2015 and find out about his role in the impending Peninsular War.

Episodes

Season 1

Season 2

Season 3

Season 4

Special appearances

Season 1

Episode 1 
 Hovik Keuchkerian as Juan Martín Díez "El Empecinado"
  as Thibaud
 Iván Villanueva as Benito

Episode 2 
 Víctor Clavijo as Lope de Vega
 Miguel Rellán as Gil Pérez
 Miguel Ángel Somé as Alonso de Entrerríos, Jr. (Alonso's son)

Episode 3 
  as Heinrich Himmler
 Pep Miràs as Francisco Franco
 Miko Jarry as Adolf Hitler
 Frank Feys as Heinrich Müller
 Markus Lambauer as Captain Schweinsteiger
 Pep Sais as Antoni Maria Marcet i Poal, abbot of Montserrat
 Jorge Pobes as Luis Orcajo
 Julio Arrojo as Ángel

Episode 4 
 Michelle Jenner as Isabella of Castile
  as Tomás de Torquemada
 Eusebio Poncela as Francisco Jiménez de Cisneros
  as Rabbi Abraham Levi
 Carlos Álvarez-Nóvoa as Don Manuel López Castillejo
 Ben Temple as Aaron Stein
  as the Inquisition prosecutor

Episode 5 
 Raúl Pulido as Pablo Picasso
 Roberto Álvarez as Julián's father
 Vicente Gil as Fernando Jiménez del Oso

Episode 6 
 Juan Blanco as Lázaro de Tormes
  as Fray Juan
 Francesc Orella as Alberto Díaz Bueno

Episode 7 
 María Cotiello as Nuria Celaya (Irene's wife)
 Carmen Sánchez as Isabella II
 Carmen Gutiérrez as Maria Christina of the Two Sicilies
 Celine Peña as Infanta Luisa Fernanda
 Manolo Solo as Undersecretary Emilio Redón

Episode 8 
 Ángel Ruiz as Federico García Lorca
  as Salvador Dalí
  as Luis Buñuel
 Antonio Alcalde as Pepín Bello
 Secun de la Rosa as Antonio Lancha
  as Silvia (Amelia's granddaughter)
 Mar del Hoyo as Rosita Díaz Gimeno
 Jordi Hurtado as himself

Season 2

Episode 9 
 Antonio Velázquez as Rodrigo Díaz de Vivar "El Cid"
 Sergio Peris-Mencheta as Rogelio Buendía / Imposter Cid
 Savitri Ceballos as Jimena Díaz
 Luis G. Gámez as Ramón Menéndez Pidal
 Pablo Scola as Charlton Heston
 Vincente Colomar as Blas de Lezo

Episode 10 
 Andrés Gertrúdix as 
  as Pacino's father
 Antonio Reyes as Morán's father
 Ximena Vera as Morán's mother
 Carmela Lloret and Eva Llorach as two of Morán's victims

Episode 11 
 Pere Ponce as Miguel de Cervantes
 Víctor Clavijo's second appearance as Lope de Vega
 Jimmy Shaw as Lord Charles York/Walcott
 Markos Marín as John Bennet
 Miguel Rellán's second appearance as Gil Pérez

Episode 12 
 Fernando Cayo as Napoleon Bonaparte
  as Rodolfo Suárez
 Jordi Martínez as Michel Ney
 Nadia de Santiago as Rosa del Amo
  as Sor Flora
 Aránzazu Zorate as Sor Paula
 Sonia Almarcha as Sor Antonia

Episode 13 
 Elena Furiase as Micaela Amaya
 José Luis Torrijo as Doctor Vargas
 José Ramón Iglesias as Germán
 Tania Vilamarín as María Pita
 Joaquín Gómez as Germán's father
 Jaime Zatarain as Ramón de la Vega
 Pepe Zafra as young Velázquez
 Guillermo Vallverdú as Mariano
 Javier Laorden as Pepe
  as Gregorio Marañón
 José Luis Patiño as Francisco Pacheco
 Sergi Méndez as young Alonso de Entrerríos
 Nicole Valle as young Blanca

Episode 14 
 Miki Esparbé as Joaquín María Argamasilla
 Gary Piquer as Harry Houdini
 Rick Zingale as L. Gromek
  as Josefa
  as J. Edgar Hoover
 Juan Carlos Sánchez as Ramón del Valle-Inclán
 Juan Antonio Quintana as Santiago Ramón y Cajal
 Pedro Miguel Martínez as Joaquín José Javier Argamasilla

Episodes 15/16 
 Pedro Alonso as Saturnino Martín Cerezo
  as 
  as Antonio Sanchez Menache
  as José Lafarga Abad
 Joan Carles Suau as Miguel
 Borja Maestre as Heredia
 Alberto Jiménez as 
 Juan José Ballesta as Vicente González Toca
 Nacho Sánchez as Rafael Ríos
 Andrey Finanta as Alejo
 Vanessa Castro as Maria
 Pastora Vega as Pacino's mother
 Mónica Estarreado as Asunción
  as Luis Méndez (Pacino's father)

Episode 17 
  as Philip V of Spain
 María Álvarez as Elisabeth Farnese
 Algis Arlauskas as Ferguson

Episode 18 
 Carlos Cuevas as Javier
 Mario Tardón as Dr. Madrigal
 Arnau García as young Salvador Martí
 Alexandra Jiménez as Teresa Méndez / Julia Lozano
 Rosa Vivas as Salvador's adoptive mother

Episode 19 
  as Sebastián Lombardi
 Anna Castillo as Sonia Lombardi
 Joan Carreras as Christopher Columbus

Episode 20 
 Nancho Novo as Don Fadrique de Villaespesa
 Alba Ribas as Constanza
 Chusa Barbero as Claudia
 Raúl Cimas as Isaac Vila
 Richard Sahagún as Alberto Ortigosa
 Garbiñe Insausti as Natalia Vila
 Maitane San Nicolás as Rocio
 Patrick Criado as Sancho
 Félix Arkarazo as Ernest Hemingway
 Javier Mula as Saavedra
 Pepe Rodríguez as himself

Episode 21 
 Carlos Hipólito as Philip II of Spain
 Carlos Kaniowsky as 
 Víctor Duplá as Agustín Argüelles
 Jon Ariño as De las Cuevas
 Carlos Cuevas as Javier
 Maitane San Nicolás as Rocio
 Marta Nieto as Isabella of Portugal
 Jordi Hurtado as himself

Season 3

Episode 22 
 José Ángel Egido as Alfred Hitchcock
 Pierre Kiwitt as Petrov
 Óscar de la Fuente as Francisco Morales
 Julia Fossi as Alma Reville
  as waiter

Episode 23 
  as William Martin
 Antonio Dechent as Mr. Naylor
  as Mrs. Naylor
 Christian Stamm as Sgt. Sommer
 Mark Schardan as Ewen Montagu
 Mikel Tello as Azcárate
 Miko Jarry's second appearance as Adolf Hitler

Episode 24 

 Tamar Novas as Gustavo Adolfo Bécquer
 Miryam Gallego as Mencía
  as Juana
  as Faustino
 Adelfa Calvo as Aurelia
 Joan Arias as Damián
 Jorge San José as Valero
 Teresa Almeda as Agustina

Episode 25 

 Pedro Casablanc as Francisco de Goya
 María Adánez as María Josefa Pimentel, Duchess of Osuna
 Luis Callejo as Manuel Godoy
 Raquel Pérez as María Teresa del Toro
  as Pepita Tudó
 Itzan Escamilla as young Simón Bolívar
 Noemí Ruiz as María "Cayetana" de Silva, 13th Duchess of Alba

Episode 26 

 Fernando Guillén Cuervo as Francisco Gómez de Sandoval y Rojas, 1st Duke of Lerma
 Scott Cleverdon as Charles Howard
  as Anthony Peel
  as Felipe III of Spain
 Óscar de la Fuente as Francisco Morales
  as 
 Mariano Venancio as Azpilicueta
  as Encarna
 Paco Hidalgo as Carrasco
 Nick Devlin as William Shakespeare
 Pere Ponce as Miguel de Cervantes

Episode 27 

 Lluís Soler as Père Folch (Amelia's uncle)
 Chete Lera as Antonio López, 1st Marquess of Comillas
  as Alfonso XII of Spain
 Gal Soler as Práxedes Mateo Sagasta
 Nacho Marraco as Doctor Morales
  as Eusebi Güell
 Carlos Villarino as young Antonio López, 1st Marquess of Comillas
 César Vea as overseer
 Mario Makón as Tomasín
 Tamara Ndong as Tomasín's mother

Episode 28 

 Pep Tosar as Luis Buñuel
 Carlos Areces as Ambrosio Pitaluga
  as Domingo Dominguín
  as Alberto Larra
 Carolina Vázquez as María Asunción Girón
  as José María Muñoz Fontán
 Enrique Asenjo as Juan Antonio Bardem
  as Francisco Rabal
 Michel Herráiz as young Jesús Méndez Pontón
  as Olivia
 Andrea López as Sandrita

Episode 29 

 Miguel Ángel Muñoz as Gonzalo Guerrero
  as Gerónimo de Aguilar
  as Gaspar de Entrerríos (Alonso's grandfather)
  as fake Bernal Díaz del Castillo
 Marco Tulio as Andrés Román
 Jan Fresneda as young Alonso de Entrerríos
 Valentín Garcés as young Salvador Martí / Salvador Roa

Episode 30 

  as Abraham Levi
 Francesc Corbera as Ginés Morcillo
 Jorge Kent as Master of the Knights Templar
 Fernando Díaz as Hugo de Claramonte
 José Luis Matienzo as Simón Cascajosa
  as Adolfo Suárez
 Rodrigo Sáenz de Heredia as young Salvador Martí / Salvador Roa
  as Antipope Benedict XIII «Papa Luna»
 Michel Herráiz as young Jesús Méndez Pontón
 Andrea López as Sandrita
  as Felipe III of Spain

Episode 31 

 Juan Pablo Shuk as Simón Bolívar
 Said El Mouden as Habib
  as Arteche
 Inma Lloret as Manuela Sáenz
 Guido Balzaretti as Cosme
  as Rafael Urdaneta

Episode 32 

  as Tomás Bretón
  as 
 Eva Manjón as 
 Fernando Albizu as Arregui
 Pepa Charro as 
 José Troncoso as 
 Norma Ruiz as 
 Jorge Basanta as Benito Pérez Galdós
 Manuel Brun as 
 Pedro García de las Heras as José Echegaray
  as Arteche

Episode 33 

 Pablo Viña as Usher
  as Torcuato Fernández-Miranda
 Toni Medina as leader of the Ángel Exterminador
 Pablo Menasanch as leader of the Comunero
  as Adolfo Suárez

Episode 34 

  as Leopoldo Ureña
 Sergio Villanueva as Narciso "Chicho" Ibáñez Serrador
  as Juan Ureña
  as Jesús Aparicio-Bernal
 Arturo Querejeta as Director
  as Jaime Blanch
 Juan Renedo as Fernando Guillén
 Ruth Santamaría as Gemma Cuervo

Season 4

Episode 35 

 Pep Mirás as Francisco Franco
 Koldo Olabarri as Luis García Berlanga
 Belén Ponce de León as Carmen Polo
 Luichi Macías as Ministry's Agent of 1943
 Olga Rodríguez as Wife of the productor of Amor y Patria
 Rafael Calatayud as Javier Zurrilla
 Carolina García as Ana Quijada

Episode 36 

  as Felipe IV de España and Fabio McNamara
 Carlos Santos as Pedro Almodóvar
 Raúl Prieto as Ángel Fuensanta Carrasco
 Vito Sanz as Eduardo Robles Prieto
 Claudio Portalo as Antonio Banderas
 Eduardo Antuña as Porter
 Palmira Ferrer as neighbour of Carolina

Episode 37 

 Jorge Clemente as young Felipe II of Spain
 Rachel Lascar as Mary I of England
 Jesús Noguero as Fernando Álvarez de Toledo y Pimentel, III duke of Alba
 Ramón Esquinas as Count of Egmont
  as Padre Bartolomé Carranza
 Rosa Blake as Elizabeth I of England
 Julius Cotter as Sir Henry Bedingfeld
 Robert Crumpton as Lord Arthur
 Pere Costa as Amelia's employee 1885

Episode 38 

 Francesc Orella as Alberto Díaz Bueno
  as Pablo Picasso
  as Clara Campoamor
 Claudio Villarubia as Braulio
 Lydia López as Agustina
 Stéphanie Magnin as Dora Maar
 Annick Weerts as Marie-Thérèse Walter
 Astrid Jones as Joséphine Baker

Episode 39 

 Jan Fresneda as Alonso de Entrerríos (child)
 Asier Flores as Julián Martínez (child)
 David García as Psychiatrist

Episode 40 

 Vicente Romero as Emilio Herrera
  as María Sofía Beltrán Ruiz
 Rodrigo Sáenz de Heredia as young Salvador Martí / Salvador Roa
 Beatriz Arjona as young María Sofía Beltrán Ruiz
 Thomas Sauerteig as Albert Einstein
 Paco Lahoz as Baldovinos
 Juan Vinuesa as Gerardo
 Fran Calvo as Emilio Herrera (father)
 Raúl Escobar as Ignacio María Ayerbe de la Fuente Giménez-Salgado
 Quim Ramos as Arturo
 Oti Manzano as Irene Aguilera

Episode 41 

 Juan Codina as 
  as himself and Fernando VII de España
 Camila Viyuela as María Cristina de Borbón-Two Sicilies
  as Carlos María Isidro de Borbón
 Fernando Sansegundo as Francisco Tadeo Calomarde
 Victoria Dal Vera as Doctor

Episode 42 

 Anna Cortés as Iria Martínez
 Fiorella Faltoyano as Dolores "Lola" Mendieta (old)
 Marta Milans as Inspectora Carmen Ayala

Awards
The series won the 2015 Ondas Award for Best Spanish Series. In 2017 it won at Premios Feroz the awards for best drama series, best lead actress (Aura Garrido) and best supporting actor for a television series (Hugo Silva, tied with Velvet'''s José Sacristán).

|-
| align = "center" rowspan = "4" | 2016
| rowspan = "4" | 4th 
| colspan = "2" | Best Drama Series
| 
| rowspan = "4" | 
|-
| Best Direction
|
| 
|-
| Best Screenplay 
| 
| 
|-
| Best Drama Actor
| Hugo Silva
| 
|-
| align = "center" rowspan = "9" | 2017
| rowspan = "8" | 4th Feroz Awards
| colspan = "2" | Best Drama Series
| 
| rowspan = "8" | 
|-
| Best Lead Actress (TV)
| Aura Garrido
| 
|-
| rowspan = "2" | Best Lead Actor (TV)
| Nacho Fresneda
| 
|-
| Rodolfo Sancho
| 
|-
| rowspan = "3" | Best Supporting Actor (TV)
| Hugo Silva 
| 
|-
| Julián Villagrán
| 
|-
| Jaime Blanch
| 
|-
| Best Supporting Actress (TV)
| Cayetana Guillén Cuervo
| 
|-
| 5th 
| Best Drama Actor 
| Nacho Fresneda
| 
| 
|-
| align = "center" rowspan = "7" | 2018
| rowspan = "5" | 5th Feroz Awards
| colspan = "2" | Best Drama Series
| 
| rowspan = "5" | 
|-
| Best Lead Actor (TV)
| Hugo Silva
| 
|-
| Best Lead Actress (TV)
| Aura Garrido
| 
|-
| Best Supporting Actress (TV)
| Cayetana Guillén Cuervo
| 
|-
| Best Supporting Actor (TV)
| Jaime Blanch
| 
|-
| rowspan="2" | 5th Platino Awards
| Best Miniseries or TV series
| El Ministerio del Tiempo
| 
| rowspan="2" style="text-align:center;"| 
|-
| Best Actress in a Miniseries or TV series
| Aura Garrido
| 
|-
| align = "center" rowspan = "5" | 2021
| 8th Feroz Awards
| colspan = "2" | Best Drama Series
| 
| 
|-
| rowspan = "4" | 22nd Iris Awards
| colspan = "2" | Best Fiction ||  || rowspan = "4" align = "center" | 
|-
| Best Actor || Jaime Blanch || 
|-
| Best Screenplay || El ministerio del tiempo's writing team || 
|-
| Best Production || María Roy, Alicia Yubero, Marc Vigil & Javier Olivares || 
|}

International adaptations
A Portuguese language adaptation entitled  was produced by Iniziomedia. The format has also been sold to China, with negotiations mentioned for Germany, France, Italy and US. An adaptation of the series was shot in Ukraine, but has not been released.

Timeless lawsuit
On 27 September 2016 Onza Partners presented a lawsuit to the CDCA against Sony Pictures, NBCUniversal, and executive producers Shawn Ryan, Eric Kripke and John Davis for copyright infringement and breach of implied contract, claiming that the U.S. TV series Timeless is a copy of El Ministerio del Tiempo.

The defendants responded to the suit in a November 23, 2016 filing, contending that shows about time travel are an established television genre, and that similarities between the two shows are generic, and largely based on the notion that the main characters will travel in time to effect some kind of change. A request to dismiss Onza's lawsuit by Sony was denied on February 15, 2017, but the two parties ultimately came to an agreement and jointly moved to dismiss.

See also
 Quantum Leap Timeless Time travel in fiction
 Time travel
 Novikov self-consistency principle
 Grandfather paradox
 Valérian and Laureline Timecop The Corridors of Time The Time Tunnel Doctor Who Timeslip Into the Labyrinth (TV series) Outlander (TV series) Primeval (TV series) Goodnight Sweetheart (TV series)''

References

External links
  
 
 The Ministry of Time on FilmAffinity
 TVE risks with The Ministry of Time with new formats
 The Multicolored Diary: The best time-travel TV show you are probably not watching this season
 MipTV: RTVE, Onza’s Department of Time Discovers Chinese TV Market | Variety.
 En el tiempo | Televisión | EL PAÍS. (In Spanish). 12 April 2015.
 E=mc2 según El Ministerio del Tiempo | Televisión | EL PAÍS. (In Spanish). 16 February 2016.

2010s time travel television series
2015 Spanish television series debuts
Spanish time travel television series
Television shows set in Spain
Television series about the history of Spain
La 1 (Spanish TV channel) network series
Television shows involved in plagiarism controversies
Cultural depictions of Heinrich Himmler
Cultural depictions of Salvador Dalí
Cultural depictions of Adolf Hitler
Cultural depictions of Pablo Picasso
Cultural depictions of Federico García Lorca
Cultural depictions of Francisco Franco
Cultural depictions of Napoleon
Cultural depictions of Harry Houdini
Cultural depictions of J. Edgar Hoover
Cultural depictions of Christopher Columbus
Cultural depictions of Ernest Hemingway
Cultural depictions of Isabella I of Castile
Cultural depictions of Tomás de Torquemada
Cultural depictions of Miguel de Cervantes
Cultural depictions of Luis Buñuel
Cultural depictions of El Cid
Inquisition in fiction
2010s Spanish drama television series
2020s Spanish drama television series
Cultural depictions of Isabella II of Spain
Television series by Onza
Television controversies in Spain